Lynwood is a city in Los Angeles County, California. At the 2010 census, the city had a total population of 69,772, down from 69,845 at the 2000 census. Lynwood is located near South Gate and Compton in the central portion of the Los Angeles Basin. Incorporated in 1921, the city was once thought to be named for "Lynn Wood Sessions", wife of local dairyman Charles H. Sessions (1850-1936), but in fact Sessions's one and only wife was born Katherine E. Gould (1855-1931). Lynwood actually originated as the name of a Southern Pacific Railroad station built here in July 1884; it was originally going to be called "Wood Pulp".

Geography

According to the United States Census Bureau, the city has a total area of 4.8 square miles (12.5 km), all land.

Demographics

2010
At the 2010 census Lynwood had a population of 69,772. The racial makeup of Lynwood was 27,444 (39.3%) White (2.2% Non-Hispanic White), 7,168 (10.3%) African American, 464 (0.7%) Native American, 457 (0.7%) Asian, 206 (0.3%) Pacific Islander, 31,652 (45.4%) from other races, and 2,381 (3.4%) from two or more races. Hispanic or Latino of any race were 60,452 persons (86.6%).

The census reported that 67,120 people (96.2% of the population) lived in households, 449 (0.6%) lived in non-institutionalized group quarters, and 2,203 (3.2%) were institutionalized.

There were 14,680 households, 9,790 (66.7%) had children under the age of 18 living in them, 8,303 (56.6%) were opposite-sex married couples living together, 3,266 (22.2%) had a female householder with no husband present, 1,569 (10.7%) had a male householder with no wife present.  There were 1,281 (8.7%) unmarried opposite-sex partnerships, and 105 (0.7%) same-sex married couples or partnerships. 1,064 households (7.2%) were one person and 328 (2.2%) had someone living alone who was 65 or older. The average household size was 4.57.  There were 13,138 families (89.5% of households); the average family size was 4.62.

The age distribution was 22,977 people (32.9%) under the age of 18, 8,705 people (12.5%) aged 18 to 24, 21,245 people (30.4%) aged 25 to 44, 13,075 people (18.7%) aged 45 to 64, and 3,770 people (5.4%) who were 65 or older.  The median age was 27.8 years. For every 100 females, there were 94.7 males.  For every 100 females age 18 and over, there were 91.1 males.

There were 15,277 housing units at an average density of 3,156.4 per square mile, of the occupied units 6,829 (46.5%) were owner-occupied and 7,851 (53.5%) were rented. The homeowner vacancy rate was 1.9%; the rental vacancy rate was 3.7%.  34,023 people (48.8% of the population) lived in owner-occupied housing units and 33,097 people (47.4%) lived in rental housing units.

2000
At the 2000 census, there were 69,845 people in 14,395 households, including 12,941 families, in the city.  The population density was 5,560.3/km (14,389.2/mi2).  There were 14,987 housing units at an average density of 1,193.1/km (3,087.6/mi2).  The racial makeup of the city was 33.62% white, 13.53% African American, 1.20% Native American, 0.76% Asian, 0.39% Pacific Islander, 46.14% from other races, and 4.36% from two or more races.  82.33% of the population were Hispanic or Latino of any race.

There were 14,395 households, 63.5% had children under the age of 18 living with them, 60.5% were married couples living together, 20.6% had a female householder with no husband present, and 10.1% were non-families. 7.7% of households were made up of individuals, and 2.6% had someone living alone who was 65 or older.  The average household size was 4.70 and the average family size was 4.76.

The age distribution was 38.0% under the age of 18, 13.1% from 18 to 24, 31.2% from 25 to 44, 13.5% from 45 to 64, and 4.2% who were 65 or older.  The median age was 24 years.  For every 100 females, there were 104.6 males.  For every 100 females age 18 and over, there were 104.2 males.

The median household income was $35,888 and the median family income was $35,808. Males had a median income of $23,241 versus $19,149 for females. The per capita income for the city was $9,542.  23.5% of the population and 21.0% of families were below the poverty line.  Out of the total people living in poverty, 28.3% were under the age of 18 and 14.3% were 65 or older.

As of 2000, speakers of Spanish as their first language accounted for 77.43% of residents, while English was spoken by 22.13%, Thai was spoken by 0.16%, Samoan was spoken by 0.09%, Gujarati was spoken by 0.07%, Tagalog was spoken by 0.07%, Vietnamese by 0.05% of the population.

Lynwood went through five phases of demographic change in the 20th century. First, a colonial settlement. Second, a farming small town. Third, a mostly working-class white suburb from 1940 to 1970. Fourth, a majority African-American city between 1970 and 1990, and today, predominantly Latino.

Government and infrastructure
The Long Beach Freeway (I-710) and Century Freeway (I-105) run through the city. The C Line of the Los Angeles Metro also runs through the city, in the median of I-105, and serves the city at Long Beach Boulevard station.

Fire protection in Lynwood is provided by the Los Angeles County Fire Department. The LACFD operates Station #147 at 3161 East Imperial Highway and Station #148 at 4262 Martin Luther King Jr. Boulevard, both in Lynwood, as a part of Battalion 13 The Los Angeles County Sheriff's Department (LASD) operates the Century Station in Lynwood. The Los Angeles County Department of Health Services operates the South Health Center in Watts, Los Angeles, serving Lynwood.

Lynwood is represented in the 63rd Assembly District by Democrat Anthony Rendon and in the 33rd Senate District represented by Democrat Ricardo Lara.
Janice Hahn represents Lynwood located in the Fourth Los Angeles Board of Supervisors District.

On March 20, 2006, former mayor Paul H. Richards II was sentenced to 188 months in federal prison after being convicted in 2005 on numerous corruption charges that centered on his funneling of $6 million in city business — including exorbitant no-bid contracts — to a "consulting company" controlled by him and his family. Richards had served on the City Council from 1986 until he was recalled by voters in 2003; during that time he served seven terms as mayor.

The United States Postal Service operates the Lynwood Post Office at 11200 Long Beach Boulevard and the East Lynwood Post Office at 11634 Atlantic Avenue.

The City of Lynwood operates three parks: Lynwood City Park, Lynwood Skate Park, and Yvonne Burke-John D. Ham Park.

Education 
Most of Lynwood is served by the Lynwood Unified School District. High schools include  Lynwood High School, Marco Antonio Firebaugh High School, and Vista High School.

Public libraries
County of Los Angeles Public Library operates the Lynwood Library at 11320 Bullis Road.

Sister cities 
 Aguascalientes, Aguascalientes, Mexico
 Zacatecas, Zacatecas, Mexico
 Talpa de Allende, Jalisco, Mexico

Notable people

 Rick Adelman, NBA coach
 Jim Barr, MLB pitcher
 Glen Bell, founder of Taco Bell
 Kat Blaque, YouTube personality and transgender rights activist 
 Gennifer Brandon, WNBA player
 Kevin Costner, actor and director
 Louella Daetweiler, All-American Girls Professional Baseball League player
 Ed Fiori, professional golfer
 David Greenwood, UCLA and NBA basketball player
 Greg Harris, professional baseball pitcher
 Robert Henning, first African-American mayor of Lynwood
 Davon Jefferson, professional basketball player in the Israeli Basketball Premier League
 Leslie Jones, comedian
 Jim Ladd, radio broadcaster
 Ulysses Llanez, soccer player
 Pat Martin, radio broadcaster
 Bob May, professional golfer
 Shane Mosley, boxing champion
 Efren Navarro, professional baseball player
 Violet Palmer, NBA referee
 Fernando Pedroza, former mayor of Lynwood.
 Ricky Peters, MLB outfielder
 Paul Richards, former mayor of Lynwood
 Patty Rodriguez, producer, author, radio personality
 Ramon Rodriguez, former mayor of Lynwood
 Pete Rozelle, NFL Commissioner, 1960–89
 Loretta Sanchez, politician who served in the United States House of Representatives
 Maria Teresa Santillan, former mayor of Lynwood
 Duke Snider, Hall of Fame outfielder for the Brooklyn and Los Angeles Dodgers
 Dave Stevens, artist, illustrator and creator of the Rocketeer
 Jeff Tedford, college football coach
 Janet Thurlow – jazz singer
 Robert Van't Hof, professional tennis player and 1980 NCAA singles champion for University of Southern California
 Leon White, professional wrestler "Big Van Vader"
 Leticia Vasquez, former mayor of Lynwood
 Evelyn Wells, the first female and second African-American mayor of Lynwood
 Venus Williams, tennis player, former World no. 1 and 7-time Grand Slam winner
 "Weird Al" Yankovic, parody musician; named his 2006 album Straight Outta Lynwood in honor of his hometown

See also

 St. Francis Medical Center
 South Central Los Angeles

References

External links

 

 
Cities in Los Angeles County, California
Gateway Cities
Incorporated cities and towns in California
1921 establishments in California
Populated places established in 1921
Chicano and Mexican neighborhoods in California